Calanogas, officially the Municipality of Calanogas (Maranao and Iranun: Inged a Calanogas), is a 5th class municipality in the province of Lanao del Sur, Philippines. According to the 2020 census, it has a population of 14,985 people.

Geography

Barangays
Calanogas is politically subdivided into 17 barangays.

Climate

Demographics

Economy

References

External links
 Calanogas Profile at the DTI Cities and Municipalities Competitive Index
 [ Philippine Standard Geographic Code]
 Philippine Census Information
 Local Governance Performance Management System

Municipalities of Lanao del Sur